Indigofera nephrocarpoides is a species of plant in the family Fabaceae. It is found only in Yemen. Its natural habitat is subtropical or tropical dry forests.

References

nephrocarpoides
Endemic flora of Socotra
Least concern plants
Taxonomy articles created by Polbot